The Health Economics Unit is a Bangladesh government regulatory agency under the Ministry of Health and Family Welfare of Bangladesh responsible for providing policy advice and recommendation on the health industry to the government.

History
The Health Economics Unit traces back to a government project under the Fourth Population and Health Project of the Ministry of Health and Family Welfare, established in 1994. In 1997, the projected created the National Health Accounts. It also helped establish the Institute of Health Economics, University of Dhaka. From 1998 to 2003, the government of Bangladesh transformed the project into the Policy Research Unit. The Policy Research Unit was composed of three wings, the Health Economics Unit, Human Resources Development Unit, and Gender the NGO and Stakeholder Participation Unit. In 2002, the government merged the Health Economics Unit and the Gender the NGO and Stakeholder Participation Unit and the new entity was named Health and Economics Unit. While the Human Resources Development Unit was merged to the Administration wing of the Ministry of Health and Family Welfare.

References

1994 establishments in Bangladesh
Organisations based in Dhaka
Government departments of Bangladesh